Line 2 of the Beijing Subway is a rapid transit rail line in central Beijing that runs in a rectangular loop around the city centre.  The line traces the Ming dynasty inner city wall, which was demolished and paved over by the 2nd Ring Road and Qianmen Avenue.  Line 2, opened in 1984, is the second oldest and one of the busiest of Beijing's subway lines and the only one to serve Beijing railway station.  All 18 stations on the  line are under ground.  Ten of the 18 stations offer transfers to other lines.  Line 2's color is blue.

Hours of Operation

Because Line 2 is a loop line with no true terminus, trains are identified as either running on the inner loop, going in the clockwise direction, or on the outer loop, going in the counter clockwise direction. However, trains returning to the Taipinghu Depot either terminate at Xizhimen or Jishuitan; passengers are asked wait for a full loop line train at these stations.

The first inner loop train departs  at 5:03am.  The first outer loop train departs  at 5:09am.  The last inner loop train leaves Jishuitan at 10:55pm.  The last outer loop train leaves Xizhimen at 11:14pm.  For the official timetable, please see the Beijing Subway website.

Route
Line 2 encircles the old city center districts of Dongcheng and Xicheng and skirts the western edge of Chaoyang.  The entire line runs underground.

List of Stations
Eleven of Line 2's eighteen stations are named after gates in the old city wall. These stations end in men, meaning gate. The twelfth gate, Deshengmen (德胜门), is near  station. The following table lists Line 2 stations in the outer loop or counter clockwise order.

History
Since January 2002, the line was renamed as "Line 2".

Other Facts
The rolling stock maintenance facility is located at Taipinghu, near Jishuitan station.

Rolling Stock

Current

Former

References

Beijing Subway lines
Railway lines opened in 1984
1984 establishments in China
Railway loop lines
750 V DC railway electrification